KFXK-TV (channel 51) is a television station licensed to Longview, Texas, United States, serving East Texas as an affiliate of the Fox network. It is owned by White Knight Broadcasting, which maintains a shared services agreement (SSA) with Nexstar Media Group owner of Jacksonville-licensed NBC affiliate KETK-TV (channel 56) and Tyler-licensed low-power MyNetworkTV affiliate KTPN-LD (channel 48), for the provision of certain services. The stations share studios on Richmond Road (near Texas Loop 323) in Tyler, while KFXK-TV's transmitter is located near FM 125 in rural northwestern Rusk County (northwest of New London).

Although KFXK-TV operates a full-power signal, the broadcasting radius does not reach much of the southern part of the market. Therefore, it is relayed on low-power translator station KFXL-LD (UHF channel 29, also mapped to virtual channel 51) in Lufkin. This station's transmitter is located on SH 103 near Loop 287 northwest of Lufkin.

History
The station first signed on the air on September 9, 1984 as KLMG-TV; the station originally operated as a CBS affiliate, making it the first full-time affiliate of the network in the Tyler–Longview market since the short-lived KAEC-TV (channel 19) operated in Nacogdoches in the late 1960s. Until channel 51 signed on, CBS programming was relegated to joint primary status on KLTV (channel 7), which also juggled programming with NBC and ABC (the latter of which is now that station's sole affiliation) for many years.

KLMG-TV made national news as its founding owner, Clara McLaughlin, was the first African American woman ever to own a television station in the United States. McLaughlin bought a vacant school building located near Interstate 20 in Longview and had it renovated into a studio facility for the station. KLMG was intended to be part of a network of stations serving East Texas that would be known as the "East Texas Television Network." To this end, McLaughlin also held construction permits for KLNL on channel 19 in Nacogdoches, KLPH-TV on channel 42 in Paris, and KLDS on channel 20 in Denison. However, this plan did not come to fruition and none of the other stations ever signed on the air. KLMG wound up filing for bankruptcy just a few years later, and shut down its news department.

In April 1991, the station changed its call letters to KFXK; it also became the market's Fox affiliate; prior to the switch, viewers in the Tyler–Longview market were only able to receive Fox programming via either the network's then-Dallas owned-and-operated station KDAF (now a CW affiliate) or Shreveport affiliate KMSS-TV; those living in Houston County carried Waco affiliate KWKT-TV instead. Conversely, the switch left the market without a CBS affiliate for the next thirteen years; Max Media would later purchase KLSB (channel 19), a satellite of NBC affiliate KETK-TV (channel 56), and converted it into CBS affiliate KYTX in 2004. In the interim, CBS programming was provided on cable via Shreveport affiliate KSLA-TV, although some cable providers in the western portion of the market carried KDFW (between 1991 and 1995) or network-owned KTVT (between 1995 and 2004); cable systems in Houston County carried KBTX-TV instead. (KETK later signed on a low-power station on UHF channel 53, which assumed the KLSB call letters (which were later changed to KETK-LP) to serve as its repeater until it shut down in 2012.) By 1998, KFXK had signed on KFXL as a translator serving the Lufkin–Nacogdoches area. In January 2013, KFXL-LD migrated its operations to KETK and KFXK's studio facility in Tyler.

On April 24, 2013, the Communications Corporation of America announced the sale of its television stations, including KETK-TV, to Nexstar Broadcasting Group. KFXK and KTPN were planned be sold to Nexstar partner company Mission Broadcasting; in the case of KFXK, that station was being sold to Mission to comply with FCC duopoly rules. But on August 5, 2014, Mission withdrew its application to acquire KFXK. Nexstar continues to operate KFXK and KLPN under a shared services agreement with sister station KETK. The sale was completed on January 1, 2015.

Nexstar completed a $4 million renovation of studio and office facilities that KFXK shares with KETK in November 2017. A dedication and reception was held on November 16, which included the presence of Nexstar chairman/president/CEO Perry Sook, as well as Leslie Roberts, an anchorwoman who worked for KETK in the late 1980s, among other attendees.

Programming

Syndicated programming
Syndicated programs broadcast by KFXK-TV include The People's Court, Young Sheldon, The Big Bang Theory, Modern Family, and Divorce Court, among others.

Newscasts
KETK-TV produces 12½ hours of locally produced newscasts each week (with 2½ hours each weekday) for KFXK-TV. As a CBS affiliate, the station made two attempts at producing local newscasts; both were subsequently canceled. In 1998, KETK-TV began producing a weeknight 9:00 p.m. newscast for KFXK under a news share agreement; the program was the first prime time newscast in the Tyler-Longview market. The newscast initially received strong ratings, garnering a 3 share in only a month and a half of its debut, however, ratings fell subsequently after its original anchors left the station. The newscast was plagued with logistical problems, when Fox Sports programming scheduled during prime time hours resulted in the delay of the newscast, causing KFXK to air the program on a tape delay to allow KETK to produce its own 10:00 p.m. newscast on schedule. This occasionally led to the same meteorologist being seen on both stations simultaneously, causing some viewer confusion and giving away the fact that the KFXK newscast was not always live every night. This, coupled with the declining ratings, eventually caused station management to cancel the newscast.

KETK restored a prime time newscast on KFXK on January 28, 2008, with the debut of a half-hour 9:00 p.m. newscast (titled Fox News East Texas), which airs only on Monday through Friday evenings. On April 23, 2010, KETK became the second television station in the Tyler–Longview market (after KYTX) to begin broadcasting its local newscasts in high definition; the KFXK newscasts were included in the upgrade. KETK reportedly planned on producing a two-hour weekday morning newscast for channel 51 (to be titled Good Day East Texas), which would have debuted at the same time; a morning newscast did not debut on the station until September 2011, when the station launched a two-hour weekday newscast from 7:00 to 9:00 a.m. (titled Fox 51 Today).

Technical information

KFXK-TV subchannels
KFXK-TV's digital channel is multiplexed:

KFXL-LD subchannel

Analog-to-digital conversion
KFXK launched a full-power digital signal on UHF channel 31 on July 30, 2006, the station began testing high definition broadcasts of Fox programming on October 20, 2006, with Fox programs broadcasting in that format full-time five days later on October 25. On February 1, 2008, Longview Cable Television added KFXK's HD feed and KLPN-LP on digital cable channels 250 and 252.

KFXK-TV shut down its analog signal, over UHF channel 51, on June 12, 2009, the official date in which full-power television stations in the United States transitioned from analog to digital broadcasts under federal mandate. The station's digital signal remained on its pre-transition UHF channel 31, using PSIP to display the station's virtual channel as its former UHF analog channel 51.

See also
 Channel 31 digital TV stations in the United States
 Channel 29 digital TV stations in the United States
 Channel 51 virtual TV stations in the United States

References

Further reading
 "Texas TV Pioneer" (Clara McLaughlin interview), Ebony, March 1987, page 78 - Ironically, just before KLMG's first bankruptcy and first disbanding of its news department, this article gives an upbeat look at McLaughlin, behind the scenes at KLMG, and how well it was doing.

In other media

  (some sound issues)
  (short portion)
  (Test pattern, snowy picture)

External links

Fox network affiliates
Ion Mystery affiliates
Laff (TV network) affiliates
Television channels and stations established in 1984
1984 establishments in Texas
FXK-TV
Nexstar Media Group